Anup Soni (born 30 January 1975) is an Indian actor and anchor. He is an alumnus of the National School of Drama. Soni began his career with roles in television serials such as Sea Hawks and Saaya. He then took a break from television to work in films. He appeared in the 2003 films Kharaashein: Scars From Riots, Hum Pyar Tumhi Se Kar Baithe as well as Hathyar. In 2004, he appeared in Ashoke Pandit's film Sheen.  But he returned to television to work in CID: Special Bureau. He continues working both in films and television, and he previously worked in the serial Crime Patrol on Sony.

Personal life 
Anup Soni has married twice. His first wife was Ritu Soni, who he married in 1999. He has two daughters from this marriage: Zoya (born 2004) and Myra (born 2008). The couple got divorced in 2010.

Within a few months, on 14 March 2011, Soni married Juhi Babbar in a quiet ceremony attended only by family and close friends. He became her second husband. Juhi Babbar is the daughter of actor-turned-politician Raj Babbar and former wife of film director Bejoy Nambiar. Soni and Babbar met while working in a play produced by Nadira Babbar (Juhi's mother). In 2012, Juhi gave birth to their son Imaan.

Filmography 
{| class="wikitable sortable"
|- bgcolor="#d1e4fd"
! Year !! Film !! Role
!References 
|-
| 1999|| Godmother  || Meru Bhai
|
|-
| 2000|| Fiza || 
|
|-
| 2001|| Deewaanapan || 
|
|-
| 2002|| Raaz || 
|
|-
| 2002|| Hathyar || 
|
|-
| 2002|| Kharaashein: Scars From Riots || 
|
|-
| 2002|| Hum Pyar Tumhi Se Kar Baithe || 
|
|-
| 2003|| Gangaajal || Inspector Neelkanth Tiwari
|
|-
| 2003|| Kagaar: Life on the Edge || Adi
|
|-
| 2003|| Khushi || Vicky
|
|-
| 2003|| Footpath || Police Inspector Singh
|
|-
|2003||  Inteha || Rohit

|-
| 2004|| Des Hoyaa Pardes || SHO Randhawa
|
|-
| 2004|| Sheen || Shuakat
|
|-
| 2005|| Karkash || 
|
|-
| 2005|| Apaharan || 
|
|-
| 2006|| Tathastu || 
|
|-
| 2007|| Dus Kahaniyaan || 
|Anthology film, story Rice Plate|-
| 2009|| Chal Chalein || 
|
|-
| 2010|| Sukhmani: Hope for Life || 
|
|-
| 2010|| Striker || Chandrakant Sarang
|
|-
| 2019|| Prassthanam || Shiv || 
|-
| 2019|| Fatteshikast || Shaista Khan|| Movie on ZEE5 
|-
| 2020|| Class of '83 || ||
|-
| 2020|| Khaali Peeli || Ravi / Babuji ||
|-
| 2021|| Satyameva Jayate 2 || DCP Rajmohan Upadhyay ||
|-
|2022
|Saas Bahu Achaar Pvt. Ltd.|Dilip
|
|}

 Television 

 Balika Vadhu as Bhairon Dharamveer Singh
 Shraddha as Ajay Khurana
 Comedy Circus as himself
  Shanti Sea Hawks as ACP Kumar
 Saturday Suspense - Khamoshi (Episode 2)
 Saturday Suspense - The Switch as Ashish (Episode 61) / Forest Officer as Inspector Joshi (Episode 64) / Episode 76 as Crime Branch Insp.Anirudh / Episode 80 / Advocate Akash Verma / Vilas Thapar (Episode 107 & Episode 108)
  Saaya as Prakash, Sudha's brother
 Raat Hone Ko Hai - Hotel Maya
 Kahaani Ghar Ghar Kii as Suyash Mehra
 Remix as Raghav Dutt
 Byomkesh Bakshi (Episode: Veni Sanhar) as Nikhil (credited as Anoop Soni)
 Kahani Comedy Circus Ki C.I.D. (Episode 207 & 208) as ACP Ajatshatru/Rajesh 
 Tehkikaat I Love You as Siddharth
 Aahat Episode-35 as Mohan, Episode-55 as a serial killer, Episode-80/81 as Akash
 Crime Patrol - Host (January 2010 to April 2018)Ji Sirjee'' (Big Magic) off-air now

Web series

Television host
He has hosted the popular real-life-based crime show Crime Patrol since 2010 and he became so popular among viewers as the host of the show. In 2018, he decided to exit the show citing that currently, he wants to focus on his acting career in films and other TV shows. Since his exit, the show is now aired by actors like Divyanka Tripathi and Sonali Kulkarni.

Awards
 2010: Gold Awards - Best Actor in Supporting Role (Male) - Balika Vadhu

References

External links 

Indian male film actors
Indian male television actors
Living people
Male actors in Hindi cinema
National School of Drama alumni
Male actors from Ludhiana
1965 births
21st-century Indian male actors
Male actors in Hindi television